Henry Josef Wagons is an Australian singer/songwriter, musician, radio & TV personality and frontman of the outlaw country rock band, Wagons (band) who have released seven albums in Australia, and made their U.S. debut with 2011's Rumble, Shake and Tumble.

Background 
Henry Wagons is the grandson of Henry Krips, a Viennese emigree, principal conductor of the Adelaide Symphony Orchestra. 

Apart from his career as a recording artist, Henry is also a TV presenter and radio broadcaster. Henry Wagons was named by The Age Melbourne Magazine as one of the Top 100 Most Influential People in Melbourne in 2009.

Early bands 
In the late 1990s, Wagons played as a keyboardist in a noise group called Dworzec, which was inspired by Krautrock and bands on New Zealand label Flying Nun. Wagons played as a bassist in the rock bands Breaking the Law and The Ancients.

In 1999, Wagons formed alt-country rock band Wagons (band), who have released seven albums in Australia between 2000 and 2014

TV, radio and media interests 
Wagons was a regular segment presenter/reporter on ABC TV’s Art Nation and Sunday Arts for three years, as well as having had a regular spot on adult-contemporary music program Dig TV, bursting into people’s houses at random and critiquing their record collections. He has made multiple TV appearances on music shows, RocKwiz and Spicks and Specks. In 2014, Henry hosted the episode "RocKwiz Backstage at Bluesfest with Henry Wagons".

In  2014 Henry hosted a BBQ cooking show Keepers Of The Flame on network television Channel 10, while also  hosting interview series ‘Rogue Tales’ for James Squire.

Wagons is the host of Tower Of Song, a national Americana/roots radio show, broadcast weekly on digital radio station Double J.

Solo career 
In 2012 Wagons released his first solo offering Expecting Company; a mini album of duets featuring collaborations with Alison Mosshart (The Kills/Dead Weather), Robert Forster, Gossling, Patience Hodgson, Canada's Jenn Grant and others.

On 6 March 2013, Henry Wagons recorded Upstairs at United Vol. 9.  Henry presents 7 songs including an Elvis cover and a Waylon Jennings cover. Upstairs At United is a series of all analog, direct to tape, live studio recordings, taped above the United Records Pressing Plant, Nashville.

His debut full-length solo album After What I Did Last Night... was released in February 2016 on ABC Music.

Discography

Albums

Awards and nominations

AIR Awards
The Australian Independent Record Awards (commonly known informally as AIR Awards) is an annual awards night to recognise, promote and celebrate the success of Australia's Independent Music sector.

|-
| AIR Awards of 2017
| After What I Did Last Night
| Best Independent Country Album
| 
|-

EG Awards / Music Victoria Awards
The EG Awards (known as Music Victoria Awards since 2013) are an annual awards night celebrating Victorian music. They commenced in 2006.

|-
| EG Awards of 2012
| Henry Wagons
| Best Male
| 
|-
| Music Victoria Awards of 2016
| Henry Wagons
| Best Male
| 
|-

National Live Music Awards
The National Live Music Awards (NLMAs) are a broad recognition of Australia's diverse live industry, celebrating the success of the Australian live scene. The awards commenced in 2016.

|-
|  2017
| Henry Wagons
| Live Country or Folk Act of the Year
| 
|-

See also
 Wagons (band)

References

External links 
 

Australian alternative country singers
Living people
Year of birth missing (living people)